Changing Colours is the sixth studio album by Canadian rock band The Sheepdogs. The album was released on February 2, 2018. The following year, Changing Colours was nominated for the Juno Award for Rock Album of the Year at the 2019 Juno Awards.

Track listing

Personnel
The Sheepdogs
Ewan Currie – lead vocals, guitars, clarinet, Drums, Ukulele, piano, Synthesizer, Tambourine, Organ
Ryan Gullen – bass, backing vocals, Vibes
Sam Corbett – drums, Glockenspiel, Gong, Mandolin, Percussion, backing vocals
Shamus Currie – Organ, piano, Mellotron, trombone, backing vocals, guitar, percussion
Jimmy Bowskill – Banjo, Guitar, Mandolin, Pedal Steel Guitar, Viola, Violin, backing vocals

Additional musicians
Adam Hindle – Congas, Drums, Percussion, Triangle, Whistle

Charts

References

2018 albums
The Sheepdogs albums